Axford may refer to:


Places

England 
 Axford, Hampshire
 Axford, Wiltshire

Canada 
Axford, Saskatchewan

United States
Axford, Washington

People
 Axford (surname)